Nationality words link to articles with information on the nation's poetry or literature (for instance, Irish or France).

Events
Henry Wallis exhibits his romantic painting of The Death of Chatterton in London with the young poet and novelist George Meredith posing as his 18th-century predecessor Thomas Chatterton.

Works published in English

United Kingdom
 Elizabeth Barrett Browning:
 Aurora Leigh (first published November 15, dated 1857)
 Poems (see also Poems 1844, 1850, 1853)
 Sydney Dobell, England in Time of War
 Edward Fitzgerald, written anonymously, Salaman and Absal
 Walter Savage Landor, Antony and Octavius
 Coventry Patmore, The Espousals (The Angel in the House, Volume 2; see also The Betrothal 1854, Faithful for Ever 1860, The Victories of Love 1863)
 Wesley family, The Bards of Epworth, anthology

United States
 George Henry Boker, Plays and Poems
 Thomas Holley Chivers, Birth–Day Song of Liberty
 William Wilberforce Lord, Andre
 Mortimer Thomson, writing under the pen name "Q. K. Philander Doesticks, P. B." (Without the pen name's abbreviations: "Queer Kritter Philander Doesticks, Perfect Brick"), Plu-ri-bus-tah, A Song That's by No Author, a satire of  Henry Wadsworth Longfellow's Hiawatha
 Francois Dominique Rouquette, Fleurs d'Amerique
 Charles Sangster, The St. Lawrence and the Saguenay and Other Poems , Canadian poet published in New York
 Walt Whitman, Leaves of Grass, second edition
 John Greenleaf Whittier, The Panorama and Other Poems

Other
 Charles Sangster, The St. Lawrence and the Saguenay and Other Poems , Canadian poet published in New York by subscription

Works published in other languages
 Aleardo Aleardi, Il Monte Circello ("Mount Circello"), Italy
 Juris Alunāns, Songs, Latvia
 Victor Hugo, Les Contemplations, France

Births
Death years link to the corresponding "[year] in poetry" article:
 January 9 – Lizette Woodworth Reese (died 1935), American
 January 22 – A. D. Godley (died 1925), Irish-born English classical scholar and writer of light verse
 March 4 – Toru Dutt (died 1877), Indian, writing in Sanskrit, French and English
 April 7 – Mohammed Abdullah Hassan (died 1920), poet and emir of  Diiriye Guure
 August 20 – Jakub Bart-Ćišinski (died 1909), Sorbian poet, writer, playwright and translator
 Date not known – Kattakkayathil Cherian Mappila (died 1936), Indian, Malayalam-language poet

Deaths
Birth years link to the corresponding "[year] in poetry" article:
 February 17 – Heinrich Heine (born 1797), German
 May 2 – James Gates Percival (born 1795), American poet and scientist
 July 21 – Emil Aarestrup (born 1806), Danish
 July 29 – Karel Havlíček Borovský, Czech
 Date not known – Irayimman Thampi (born 1782), Indian, Malayalam-language poet in the court of Swathi Thirunal Rama Varma; wrote ' 'Omana tinkal kitjavo' ', a "cradle song" (or lullaby) still popular in Malayalam

See also

 19th century in poetry
 19th century in literature
 List of years in poetry
 List of years in literature
 Victorian literature
 French literature of the 19th century
 Poetry

Notes

19th-century poetry
Poetry